A referendum on the Torrijos–Carter Treaties was held in Panama on 23 October 1977. Voters were asked whether they approved of the treaties with the United States, which would give Panama control of the Panama Canal in 1999 and abrogate the Hay–Bunau-Varilla Treaty of 1903. Around 67% voted in favour, with a voter turnout of 97.3%.

Results

References

1977 referendums
1977
1977 in Panama
October 1977 events in North America